Ajesh is an Indian music composer & singer from Chennai, Tamil Nadu. He works primarily for the Tamil film industry.

Early life
Ajesh was born and brought up in Chennai, Tamil Nadu, India. His mother found music in him at a very young age and helped him take up Carnatic music vocal lessons. He went on to explore other forms of music later. He did his schooling in Sri Krishnaswamy Matriculation Higher Secondary School and then graduated from Loyola College, Chennai.

Career
Ajesh started singing concerts and TV shows at the age of 5 and was very focused on pursuing music throughout. His first appearance on television was on Sun TV's Sapthaswarangal hosted by A.V.Ramanan in 1994. Since the age of 12 he was part of kids chorus for various composers such as Ilaiyaraaja, A.R.Rahman and Vidyasagar. When he was 19, he was crowned the winner of the popular reality based singing competition Airtel Super Singer, chosen by the public through voting and also by composer Yuvan Shankar Raja. Later in 2010, Yuvan made Ajesh sing the famous romantic number Idhu Varai for the Tamil movie Goa, which was his debut song in films. On 1 June 2013 he released an independent music album titled Rain, College, Love - The Connect. He debuted as a composer with the Tamil film Paambhu Sattai in 2017. In 2022, his work for the ZEE5 Original Series Vilangu brought him a lot of praises from critics as well as the public.

Discography

As a Music Composer

Films

Television

As a Singer

Miscellaneous Projects

References

Living people
Tamil playback singers
Indian male playback singers
Loyola College, Chennai alumni
Singers from Chennai
Tamil film score composers
Indian male film score composers
Year of birth missing (living people)